The State of the Union (SOU) is an annual forum for high-level reflection on the European Union organized by the European University Institute (EUI) in Florence, Italy, since 2011. The conference acts as a bridge between academia and policy-making in Europe, bringing together heads of states, presidents and representatives of EU institutions, academic experts, business and opinion leaders, NGOs, think tanks, journalists and representatives of civil society.

The conference has addressed topics including climate, migration, surveillance and freedom, the role of Europe in a globalized world, the Eurozone crisis, gender, citizenship, solidarity, 21st-century democracy, and Europe's management of the COVID-19 pandemic. The theme of each conference is designed by an annually changing Scientific Committee of experts and academics from within the EUI community.

The event is renowned for high-level participation and discussion, prominent media coverage, and consistent timing: the conference falls annually around 9 May, the anniversary of the Schuman Declaration, making Florence the center of Europe on Europe day.

History 
The first conference took place in 2011 as the central event of the Festival d’Europa (Festival of Europe), an annual festival in Florence. Subsequently, the European University Institute brought the event in-house; the mission of the stand-alone event has since been to contribute to the analysis of the European Union's current situation and debate EU policies and the functioning of EU institutions.

Format 

The event typically lasts three days. The first day is at the Badia Fiesolana, the EUI's hilltop premises in Fiesole, and its program features an array of parallel sessions and fringe events. The second day is held at Palazzo Vecchio, Florence's historic town hall, and hosts dignitaries from Europe and beyond. It features high-level discussions, addresses and interviews. The third day is an Open Day held at the Historical Archives of the European Union, housed at Villa Salviati at the EUI. It welcomes local residents to experience the architecture and gardens of Villa Salviati

and learn about the European project and its cultural and historical heritage first-hand through participation in guided tours, exhibitions, tastings, cultural and leisure events.

Past Editions

2011: The State of the Union 
The inaugural edition (9-10 May) held at Palazzo Vecchio explored key political and economic issues facing the EU. Across four panels, discussions centred around the reforms of the Treaty of Lisbon, Europe in the globalised world, the Euro and global economic governance, and employment and financial stability in the wake of the global financial crisis.

2012: The State of the Union 
The second edition (9-10 May) explored the challenges of globalisation, climate change, Europe's role as a global actor, economic governance and EU energy policy at the time of the global recession and the European sovereign debt crisis.

2013: The State of the Union 
The third edition of The State of the Union (9 May) widened its analysis of the present and future prospects of the European Union and sought to integrate the opinions of European citizens, through luminaries from academia, business and the news media, including the Financial Times and Le Monde. Sessions explored in depth the EU's challenges, such as the future of EU citizenship and free movement.

2014: The Future of the Social and Political Model for Europe and the Upcoming European Elections 
2014's edition (7-9 May) centred around the future of the social and political model for Europe and the upcoming European Parliament elections. The event also promoted awareness about the activity of the European Union as news agencies televised the live Spitzenkandidaten debate in which José Bové, Jean-Claude Juncker, Martin Schulz and Guy Verhofstadt faced each other for a debate in the contest for the Presidency of the European Commission.

2015: Confronting the Future of Europe 
The programme of the 2015 edition (6-9 May) was composed of 13 panels that discussed Europe's need of a new narrative or Schuman Declaration, Europe's role in peacekeeping and stabilization, cybersecurity, surveillance and freedom.

2016: Women in Europe and the World 
Feeding into a groundswell of global discussions about the position of women in societies around the world, the 2016 edition (5-7 May), titled "Women in Europe and the World", brought a gendered perspective to an array of policy areas. The State of the Union countered the trend of female underrepresentation at high-level conferences with women's voices making up 66% of the 92 speakers, the highest number of speakers in a single edition to date, and 62% of the Scientific Committee.

2017: Building a People’s Europe 
The 2017 edition (4-6 May), under the title "Building a People’s Europe", mainly focused on the meaning of European citizenship in the 21st century in the context of Brexit. Topics discussed also included direct democracy, referendums and populism, the impact of the global refugee emergency on Europe, the economic and monetary integration of the EU, the labour market and free movement of people and state secrecy and security in Europe. Jean-Claude Juncker, then president of the European Commission sparked controversy when stating, saying that the English language is "losing importance".

2018: Solidarity in Europe 
The 2018 edition (10-12 May) consisted of 14 sessions which dealt with the theme of European solidarity. This year saw the development of the Fringe Events programme, established as part of the EUI's commitment to diversify conference participants and create new synergies between the institute and the local political environment.

2019: 21st-Century Democracy in Europe 
With the European elections just weeks away from the conference, democracy was the central theme chosen for the 2019 edition. Speakers debated and discussed the challenges of democracy in areas such as the European elections, the rule of law, disinformation and fake news, reflections on the democratic transition in Eastern Europe; the democratic legitimacy of immigration policies, intergenerational inequalities, trust in the single market, democratising the EU's external action and Global Governance trends to 2030. The highlight of the conference was the debate amongst the then Spitzenkandidaten for the position of President of the European Commission.

2020: Europe: Managing the COVID-19 Crisis 
The special edition of SOU took place during the COVID-19 pandemic. The theme of the entirely online event fostered reflection on three key policy areas profoundly impacted by the pandemic: public health, the economy and global cooperation. The scientific content of the conference was supported by a first look at YouGov international public opinion surveys on topics relating to the impact on the pandemic on various social issues. The EUI created a podcast series for the first time containing key take-aways from the panel debates.

References

External links 
 European University Institute
 The State of the Union
 The State of the Union: Past Editions

European Union